The Peace and Democracy Movement was a social democratic political party in the de facto Turkish Republic of Northern Cyprus. In the last legislative elections for the House of Representatives of Northern Cyprus - 20 January 2005 - the party won 5.8% of the popular vote and 1 out of the 50 seats in the assembly. The leftist current was very strong.

The last leader of BDH was Mustafa Akıncı, a deputy in TRNC Assembly of the Republic. In May 2007, it merged with the Communal Liberation Party to form the Communal Democracy Party.

See also
:Category:Peace and Democracy Movement politicians

External links
Peace and Democracy Movement official site

Defunct political parties in Northern Cyprus
Cypriot nationalism